Without a Song is the 29th studio album by country singer Willie Nelson. Similar to Stardust (1978), it consists of renditions of traditional pop standards.

Track listing
"Without a Song" (Billy Rose, Edward Eliscu, Vincent Youmans) - 3:54
"Once in a While" (Bud Green, Michael Edwards) - 4:27
"Autumn Leaves" (Johnny Mercer) - 4:04
"I Can't Begin to Tell You" (James V. Monaco, Mack Gordon) - 4:03
"Harbor Lights" (Hugh Williams, Jimmy Kennedy) - 3:52
"Golden Earrings" (Jay Livingston, Ray Evans, Victor Young) - 3:48
"You'll Never Know" (Harry Warren, Mack Gordon) - 4:13
"To Each His Own" (Jay Livingston, Ray Evans) - 4:09
"As Time Goes By" (Herman Hupfeld) - 3:54
"A Dreamer's Holiday" (Kim Gannon, Mabel Wayne) - 3:27

Personnel
Willie Nelson – acoustic guitar, guitar, vocals
Bobby Emmons – keyboards
Billy Gene English – percussion
Paul English – drums
Gene Chrisman – drums
Julio Iglesias – vocals on "As Time Goes By"
Booker T. Jones – organ, arranger, keyboards
Grady Martin – guitar
Bobbie Nelson – piano
Jody Payne – guitar, vocals
Bee Spears – bass guitar
Billie Jo Spears – bass guitar
Toni Wine – vocals
Bobby Wood – keyboards, vocals
Reggie Young – guitar
Jules Chaikin - string and horn conductor

Chart performance

1983 albums
Willie Nelson albums
Albums produced by Booker T. Jones
Columbia Records albums
Covers albums
Traditional pop albums